Joseph Wells (30 December 1855 – 1929) was a British author and Oxford academic, where he served as Vice-Chancellor from 1923 to 1926.

Educated at Reading School and the Queen's College, Oxford, Wells became a tutor in 1883 and then in 1913 Warden of Wadham College, Oxford.

Selected publications

Articles

Books
 Oxford and its Colleges, etc.
 A Short History of Rome to the Death of Augustus (1896)
 Wadham College (1898)
 The Oxford Degree Ceremony, Clarendon Press (1906)
 The Charm of Oxford (1920)
 ed. (with W. W. How) Herodotus (2 vols)
Studies in Herodotus, 1923

References

External links
 
 

1855 births
1929 deaths
English non-fiction writers
Fellows of Wadham College, Oxford
People educated at Reading School
Wardens of Wadham College, Oxford
Vice-Chancellors of the University of Oxford
English male non-fiction writers